São Camilo State Park, formerly the São Camilo Biological Reserve, is a state park in the state of Paraná, Brazil.

Location

Responsibility for administration was given to the Paraná Institute of Lands, Cartography and Forests, with participation by the Paraná Agronomic Institute.
Soon after its establishment the area began to be visited by the local people for recreational purposes.
This is not legally allowed for a biological reserve.
To allow for visitors and environmental education while still preserving the local biodiversity, the status was changed to State Park.

Conservation

The purpose of the biological reserve is to preserve the fauna and flora.
Exploitation of the reserve and changes to the environment were originally prohibited.
The park contains vegetation in an advanced stage of recovery.
As one of the last fragments of forest of any size in the region it is a haven for wildlife.
It is included in the Caiuá – Ilha Grande Biodiversity Corridor.

Notes

Sources

1990 establishments in Brazil
State parks of Brazil
Protected areas of Paraná (state)
Protected areas established in 1990